Peter Bosse (born Heinrich Peter Friedrich Willi Bosse, 15 January 1931 – 21 September 2018) was a German film actor. The son of actress Hilde Maroff, he appeared as a child actor in a number of Nazi era films during the 1930s. Later he often worked as a narrator in the post-war era.

Selected filmography
 Forget Me Not (1935)
 All Because of the Dog (1936)
 Schlußakkord (1936)
 Mother Song (1937)
 Woman's Love—Woman's Suffering (1937)
 The Woman at the Crossroads (1938)
 Robert and Bertram (1939)

References

Bibliography
 Waldman, Harry. Nazi Films in America, 1933-1942. McFarland, 2008.

External links

1931 births
2018 deaths
Male actors from Berlin
German male film actors
German male child actors